Front of Yonge is a township found in the United Counties of Leeds and Grenville in Ontario, Canada. It is the location of the Thousand Islands National Park and Brown's Bay Provincial Park, as well as a number of private campgrounds, the Jones Creek walking trail system, and the 1000 Islands Waterfront Trail’s walking/bike path which runs from just beyond the township’s eastern boundary to neighbouring towns. The predominance of the Canadian Shield produces scenic and diverse landscapes which include exposed rock formations and heavy tree cover, as well as wide fields and beaches.

Location
Front of Yonge is located along the St. Lawrence River in the Thousand Islands region. Part of the Frontenac Arch Biosphere Reserve, Front of Yonge can be found between the larger towns of Brockville to the east, and Gananoque to the west.

Communities
The township comprises the communities of Ballycanoe, Caintown, Mallorytown, Mallorytown Landing, McIntosh Mills, Trevelyan and Yonge Mills. The township administrative offices are located in Mallorytown.

Mallorytown
The largest settlement area of the township is the Village of Mallorytown, founded by United Empire Loyalist Nathaniel Mallory. He came ashore at Mallorytown Landing in 1784, and later moved inland in search of better farmland. This village is the site of Canada's first glassworks factory, which began in 1839, and closed in 1940. Only a few pieces of Mallorytown glass still exist, the most famous being the ‘Mallorytown Pitcher' which is on display at the Royal Ontario Museum. A reproduction of this piece is currently on display at the Mallory Coach House, an 1850s stone home which has been renovated and is open to visitors on weekends during the spring and summer months.

Mallorytown Landing
Mallorytown Landing is situated on the St. Lawrence River and is the location of the Visitor Centre for the Thousand Islands National Park, which comprises several ecologically important mainland properties and more than twenty islands between Kingston and Brockville. Established in 1904 as the first Canadian national park east of the Rockies, it is also the smallest of the national parks.

History
Front of Yonge is named for the Right Honourable Sir George Yonge, a British Secretary during the War of 1812. Officially designated as Front of Yonge in 1859 this township, the nearby Front of Escott and Front of Lansdowne were the only three municipalities with "Front" in their names because they all border the St. Lawrence river. Years later, both Escott and Lansdowne were assimilated into another municipality. That left Front of Yonge the only township in Ontario with "Front" in its name. Also named after Sir George are Yonge Mills Road and Townline Road Escott Yonge in this township, as well as Yonge Street, the main arterial road in Toronto.

The area was settled by a strong core of United Empire Loyalists after the American Revolutionary War who participated in the War of 1812. Mallorytown Landing was a port for ships moving supplies and a blockhouse was constructed on Chimney Island to protect the vessels. The chimney remains standing today as a National Historical site.

Demographics 

Population trend:
 Population in 1991: 2,357
 Population in 1996: 2,530
 Population in 2001: 2,639
 Population in 2006: 2,803 
 Population in 2011: 2,752
 Population in 2016: 2,680

Mother tongue:
 English as first language: 94.8%
 French as first language: 1.4%
 English and French as first language: 0.4%
 Other as first language: 3.4%

See also
List of townships in Ontario

References

External links

Lower-tier municipalities in Ontario
Municipalities in Leeds and Grenville United Counties
Township municipalities in Ontario
Ontario populated places on the Saint Lawrence River